Abisara miyazakii or Two-spotted Judy, is a butterfly in the family Riodinidae. It is found in Asia.

Subspecies
Abisara miyazakii miyazakii (Vietnam)
Abisara miyazakii shigehoi Kot. Saito & T. Saito, 2005 (Laos)

References

Butterflies described in 2005
Abisara